Ape Kaalaye Patachara is a 2016 Sri Lankan Sinhala epic biographical film directed by Sugath Samarakoon and produced by Vishwakumara Wathiyage for Helawood Films. It stars Dulani Anuradha and Saranga Disasekara in lead roles along with Vinu Udani Siriwardhana and Cletus Mendis. Music composed by Sarath Wickrama. The film was shot near Anuradhapura. It is the 1266th Sri Lankan film in the Sinhala cinema. The film has influenced on Buddhist Jathaka Stories regarding Patachara, who lost all of her family by tragic incidents.

Plot

Cast
 Dulani Anuradha as Patachara / Kumari
 Saranga Disasekara as Jeevantha
 Sarath Dikkumbura as Ranga Buddha
 Anura Dharmasiriwardena
 Cletus Mendis as Situthuma
 Vinu Udani Siriwardhana as Nun
 Anusha Dissanayake as Female monk
 Mayanga Bandara as Nun
 Samantha Weerakoon as Bhanuka
 Anusha Jayasuriya as Situ Deviya
 Sanjaya Samarakoon as Mithra Bandu
 Nandana Weerakoon as Doctor
 Helani Bandara as Sugala
 Anju Narmada as Shanthini
 Nilakshika Silva as Keshaki
 Iresha Senadhipathi as Mandani
 Priya Vithanachchi as Vishaka

Soundtrack

References

External links
පටාචාරා දර්ශන තලයේ දුලානි උමතු වෙයි

2016 films
2010s Sinhala-language films